The 2021 NASCAR Whelen Modified Tour was the thirty-seventh season of the Whelen Modified Tour (NWMT), a stock car racing tour sanctioned by NASCAR. It began with the Virginia is for Racing Lovers 200 at Martinsville Speedway on April 8 and concluded at Stafford Motor Speedway on September 25. Defending series champion Justin Bonsignore won another championship and his third in total after previously winning the 2018 title.

Schedule
On December 11, 2020, NASCAR announced the 2021 Whelen Modified Tour schedule. Among the 14 races was an inaugural stop at New York International Raceway Park and returns to Beech Ridge Motor Speedway and Martinsville Speedway.

Results and standings

Race results

Drivers' championship

These drivers finished in the top-10 in the final standings:

 Justin Bonsignore – 565
 Patrick Emerling – 543
 Ron Silk – 486
 Kyle Bonsignore – 484
 Doug Coby – 483
 Eric Goodale – 472
 Woody Pitkat – 466
 Jon McKennedy – 450
 Tyler Rypkema – 442
 Anthony Nocella – 422

See also
 2021 NASCAR Cup Series
 2021 NASCAR Xfinity Series
 2021 NASCAR Camping World Truck Series
 2021 ARCA Menards Series
 2021 ARCA Menards Series East
 2021 ARCA Menards Series West
 2021 NASCAR Pinty's Series
 2021 NASCAR Whelen Euro Series
 2021 eNASCAR iRacing Pro Invitational Series
 2021 SRX Series

References

Whelen Modified Tour